Ricca Slone (born February 19, 1947) is a former member of the Illinois House of Representatives who represented the 92nd District from 1997 to 2005.

Early life and education
Slone was born in Ottawa, Ontario and grew up in Chicago, Illinois. Slone received her B.A. from Washington University in St. Louis. She obtained an M.A. in anthropology at the University of California, Los Angeles. She also has an M.A. in public administration from Ohio State University and a J.D. from the University of Illinois College of Law. She holds an advanced certificate in international law from Chicago-Kent College of Law.

Career
Slone is an attorney whose work concentrates on environmental compliance and real estate transactions for small business. She has served on the Peoria City-County Landfill Committee. Slone previously worked at the Office of Policy Development & Research at the United States Department of Housing and Urban Development. During the Reagan administration, she worked at the United States Office of Management and Budget. Slone has worked as a consultant on regional water supply policy and as a lobbyist for the Environmental Law and Policy Center. She currently serves as a lecturer in the Master of Public Policy and Administration program at Northwestern University.

Family
Slone is divorced and has three sons; Zachary, Sydney, and Seth.

Committee assignments
Slone served on the following committees in the Illinois General Assembly:

 Appropriations-Higher Education (Chairperson)
 Environment and Energy (Vice-Chairperson)
 Health Care Availability Access
 Housing & Urban Development
 Local Government
 Subcommittee on Electric Deregulation 
 Committee of the Whole
 Subcommittee on Transit

Electoral history
Slone was named Legislator of the Year by the Illinois Environmental Council. Slone served in the Illinois House of Representatives from 1997 through 2005. She lost to Republican Aaron Schock in the 2004 general election.

References

1947 births
Living people
Women state legislators in Illinois
Democratic Party members of the Illinois House of Representatives
Politicians from Chicago
Politicians from Ottawa
Canadian emigrants to the United States
Northwestern University faculty
Illinois lawyers
John Glenn College of Public Affairs alumni
University of California, Los Angeles alumni
University of Illinois College of Law alumni
Washington University in St. Louis alumni